Willem van Blijenbergh (1632–1696) was a Dutch grain broker and amateur Calvinist theologian. He was born and lived in Dordrecht. He engaged in philosophical correspondence with Baruch Spinoza regarding the problem of evil. Their correspondence consisted of four letters each, written between December 1664 to June 1665. Blijenbergh visited Spinoza at his home in June, after which their correspondence ended.

Notes

References
Margaret Gullan-Whur (1998), Within Reason: A Life of Spinoza
Article in Dictionary of Seventeenth and Eighteenth Century Dutch Philosophers Vol. I (2003)

Further reading
 Deleuze, Gilles, Spinoza - Philosophie pratique (1970, 2nd ed. 1981). Trans. Spinoza: Practical Philosophy (1988).
 Spinoza, Benedictus de, "The Letters", Steven Barbone (Introduction), Lee Rice (Introduction), Jacob Adler (Introduction), Samuel Shirley (Translator), Hackett Publishing Company (1995)

External links

The Letters - Dedicated to Spinoza's Insights


1632 births
1696 deaths
Dutch merchants
People from Dordrecht
Dutch Calvinist and Reformed theologians
17th-century Calvinist and Reformed theologians